Chitonidae is a family of chitons or polyplacophorans, marine mollusks whose shell is composed of eight articulating plates or valves. There are fifteen extant genera in three subfamilies.

Subfamilies and genera
Subfamilies and genera within the family Chitonidae include:
 Subfamily Chitoninae Rafinesque, 1815
 Chiton Linnaeus, 1758 – the type genus of the family
 Amaurochiton Thiele, 1893
 Radsia Gray, 1847
 Sypharochiton Thiele, 1893
 Nodiplax Beu, 1967
 Rhyssoplax Thiele, 1893
 Teguloaplax Iredale & Hull, 1926
 Mucrosquama Iredale, 1893
 Subfamily Toniciinae Pilsbry, 1893
 Tonicia Gray, 1847
 Onithochiton Gray, 1847
 Subfamily Acanthopleurinae Dall, 1889
 Acanthopleura Guilding, 1829
 Liolophura Pilsbry, 1893
 Enoplochiton Gray, 1847
 Squamopleura Nierstrasz, 1905

References

 

 
Chiton families
Taxa named by Constantine Samuel Rafinesque